Adrianus Jacobus "Janus" Braspennincx (5 March 1903 in Zundert – 7 January 1977 in Breda) was a Dutch racing cyclist who competed in the 1928 Summer Olympics.

In the 1928 Summer Olympics, he won a silver medal as part of the Dutch pursuit team. He finished ninth in the team road race as a member of the Dutch road racing team, after finishing 27th in the individual road race  .

See also
 List of Dutch Olympic cyclists

References

External links
profile

1903 births
1977 deaths
Dutch male cyclists
Dutch track cyclists
Olympic cyclists of the Netherlands
Cyclists at the 1928 Summer Olympics
Olympic silver medalists for the Netherlands
Cyclists from Zundert
Olympic medalists in cycling
Medalists at the 1928 Summer Olympics
Sportspeople from Breda
Cyclists from North Brabant
20th-century Dutch people